Blue Exorcist: Kyoto Saga is the second season of the Blue Exorcist anime television series, which is animated by A-1 Pictures. It is based on the manga series of the same name written and illustrated by Kazue Kato. Koichi Hatsumi replaced Tensai Okamura as director of the series. The series aired from January 7 to March 24, 2017, on MBS's Animeism programming block.


Episode list

References

Blue Exorcist episode lists
2017 Japanese television seasons